The Lepidoptera of Palmyra Atoll consist of both the butterflies and moths recorded from Palmyra Atoll in the Pacific Ocean. The atoll consists of an extensive reef, two shallow lagoons, and some 50 sand and reef-rock islets and bars covered with vegetation—mostly coconut trees, Scaevola, and tall Pisonia trees.

According to a recent estimate, there are 11 Lepidoptera species on Palmyra Atoll.

Butterflies

Nymphalidae
Hypolimnas bolina Linnaeus, 1758

Moths

Agonoxenidae
Agonoxena argaula Meyrick, 1921

Cosmopterigidae
Anatrachyntis incertulella (Walker, 1864)

Crambidae
Piletocera signiferalis (Wallengren, 1860)

Gelechiidae
Stoeberbinus testaceus Butler, 1881

Gracillariidae
1 undescribed species

Noctuidae
Chrysodeixis eriosoma (Doubleday, 1843)
Spodoptera litura (Fabricius, 1775)

Sphingidae
Agrius cingulata (Fabricius, 1775)

Tineidae
Erechtias simulans (Butler, 1882)
1 undescribed Opogona species

External links
Arthropod surveys on Palmyra Atoll, Line Islands, and insights into the decline of the native tree Pisonia grandis (Nyctaginaceae)

Lepidoptera
Palmyra Atoll
Palmyra Atoll
Palmyra Atoll
Palmyra Atoll
Lepidoptera of Palmyra Atoll